Waubonsie State Park is a state park of Iowa, US, located in the Loess Hills region.  It is named for Chief Wabaunsee of Potawatomi tribe.

Waubonsie State Park is located in the unique Loess Hills, a landform found only along the Missouri River in Iowa and Missouri. As glaciers melted 14,000 to 28,000 years ago, the Missouri River became a major channel for huge volumes of water and sediment during the summer. In winter, the volume of the meltwater was reduced, leaving the deposited sediments exposed to the wind. These sediments of silt, clay and very fine sand particles called "loess," were then carried by strong westerly winds and deposited when these winds encountered the steep slopes of the east valley wall.

There are several distinctive features of loess hills topography. Because of the fine texture of the soil, deep, steep-sided and very narrow ridge tops have been eroded in the hills. Small, step-like terraces called "cat steps" resulting from repeated slipping of the soil can be seen on many west-facing slopes. Since the soil drains rapidly, nearly vertical cuts can be made in the soil without erosion. The unique topography of the park resembles the "badlands" of the west and harbors plants like the yucca which are normally found in more arid climates.

Nearby towns
His home is now a museum at Arbor Lodge State Historical Park and Arboretum in Nebraska.

Picnicking and shelters
A scenic open picnic shelter may be reserved online through the park reservation system.

Camping
There are 40 campsites, 24 with electrical hookups, modern shower and rest room facilities and a trailer dump station. The equestrian campground contains 32 campsites and non-modern rest room facilities. Advance campsite reservations can be made online through the park reservation system. Half of the campsites are available on a first-come, first-served basis.

Trails
The Sunset Ridge Interpretive Trail provides visitors a chance to learn about many of the park's important plants and trees, as well as enjoy the views. Waubonsie State Park is a site on the Lewis and Clark National Historic Trail.

References

External links
 Waubonsie State Park

State parks of Iowa
Protected areas established in 1926
Protected areas of Fremont County, Iowa